The Somerset Region is a local government area located in the West Moreton region of South East Queensland, Australia, about  northwest of Brisbane and centred on the town of Esk. It was created in 2008 from a merger of the Shire of Esk and the Shire of Kilcoy.  It is commonly known as the Brisbane Valley, due to the Brisbane River which courses through the region, although significant parts of the region lie outside the hydrological Brisbane Valley itself.

The Esk and Kilcoy Shires were amalgamated to consolidate the water catchments for the Wivenhoe and Somerset Dams. The Local Government Reform Commission identified that the long-term future of Somerset would be as a major water catchment for the SEQ region with farming being the main economic activity within a water catchment management regime. The "planning strategy and land use policies" implemented by the Somerset Regional Council are therefore "directed this end".

The Somerset Regional Council, which administers the region, has an estimated operating budget of 50 million. (Council's 2011/2012 budget adopted in June 2012 showed total operating revenue of 50,049,250). The Somerset region comprises the primary water catchment for the Somerset and Wivenhoe Dams that form an essential part of the water supply grid for South East Queensland.

History 

Duungidjawu (Kabi Kabi, Cabbee, Carbi, Gabi Gabi) is an Australian Aboriginal language spoken on Duungidjawu country. The Duungidjawu language region includes the landscape within the local government boundaries of Somerset Region and Moreton Bay Region, particularly the towns of Caboolture, Kilcoy, Woodford and Moore.

Garumngar (also known as Dalla, Garumga. See also Wakka Wakka related languages/dialects) is a language of the Upper Brisbane River catchment. The Garumngar language region includes the landscape within the local government boundaries of the Ipswich, Brisbane, Somerset and Moreton Bay Regional Councils, particularly the towns of Dayboro and Esk extending east towards Moggill.

Prior to 2008, the new Somerset Region was an entire area of two previous and distinct local government areas:

 the Shire of Esk;
 and the Shire of Kilcoy.

Indigenous history
The traditional owners of the Brisbane Valley district include the Jagera, Yuppera, Ugarapul and Dungibara people who occupied the region for thousands of years prior to European settlement.

Jagara (also known as Jagera, Yagara, Yugarabul, Yuggera and Yuggerabul) is one of the Aboriginal languages of South-East Queensland. There is some uncertainty over the status of Jagara as a language, dialect or perhaps a group or clan within the local government boundaries of Ipswich City Council, Lockyer Regional Council and the Somerset Regional Council.

The country of the Dungibara people started just south of Esk and ran north along the river where their boundary ended near the source of the Brisbane River. The name Dungibara is made up of two words; Dungi meaning wet, tear etc. and bara stipulating people of a place. During the drought seasons the Brisbane River became very dry and left mostly stagnant water pools, their main source of water was from the tributaries that ran into the river.

European exploration 
The Somerset region in South East Queensland was originally settled by European pastoralists in the 1840s after the New South Wales Government had opened up the land around the penal colony at Moreton Bay. The pioneers of this region sought land along the Brisbane and Stanley Rivers for raising sheep.  There were several exploration maps to guide them. John Oxley discovered the Brisbane River in December 1823 with a castaway John Finnegan as his guide who had been shipwrecked on Moreton Island and cared for by the indigenous peoples there. Oxley's recommendations lead to a penal colony being established at Redcliffe (1824) and Brisbane the following year.  Before this penal colony was closed in 1839 Botanist and explorer Alan Cunningham had discovered Spicers Gap (1827) and Cunninghams Gap (1828) through the Great Dividing Range that would link the Darling Downs with Ipswich and Brisbane.  He had also climbed Mount Esk, crossed Lockyer's Plains (later Cressbrook), named a unique bend in the Brisbane River near Wivenhoe "Pedal Bight" and climbed Lister's Peak situated two miles south east of Linville.  John Gray had explored to Fernvale; Edmund Lockyer had mapped the junction of the Stanley and Brisbane rivers and Mount Brisbane in 1826 and by 1830 Captain Patrick Logan, Commandant of the penal colony of Moreton Bay had discovered the Logan River (1829), the Bremer River (1827) and explored the Brisbane and Stanley rivers and possibly Kilcoy Creek (1830). He is thought to have been killed by indigenous tribesmen near Wivenhoe on the Brisbane River on 18 October 1830.

Settlement 
According to Henry Stuart Russell the early settlers of the Brisbane Valley followed in the footsteps of Walter & Patrick Leslie. They had "blazed a trail to the Darling Downs, marking the first tree at Wyndam's Stockyards, down the Severn River which they crossed near Texas and thence to the Condamine River between Tummaville and Ellangowan where, at Leslie's Crossing Place, the marked tree line ended." From the Downs the settlers crossed the Great Dividing Range at the new Gormans Gap, discovered by Owen Gorman and then followed Lockyer Creek to Tarampa and up the Brisbane and Stanley rivers to their headwaters. The first settlers on the eastern side of the Great Dividing Range as listed by Russell were "Cocky" Rogers with Mocatta's sheep at Grantham; Somerville at Tent Hill and Richard Jones at Helidon. Following these were Frederick and Francis Edward Bigge (Mt. Brisbane), Evan and Colin Mackenzie (Kilcoy), the McConnel Brothers (David and Frederic) at Cressbrook and the Balfour Brothers (John and Robert) at Colinton.

At the end of August 1843, the Anglican missionary John Gregor spent a fortnight in the Brisbane River valley visiting all the settlers at that time.  He saw David Archer at Durundur and his guest Ludwig Leichhardt and then visited the superintendent of Kilcoy station, John Macdonald.  He spoke with Frederick and Francis Bigge at Mt. Brisbane, Alexander and Gideon Scott at Mt. Esk (where they only ran cattle) and D.C. McConnel and his superintendent Henry Mort at Cressbrook.  He stayed with John Balfour at Colinton, Graham and Ivory at Eskdale, Borthwick and Oliver at Buaraba and Wingate and Fletcher at Lockyer's Creek.  From here he returned to Ipswich.  Approaching Kilcoy station Gregor had noted "a number of the aborigines, who were very vociferous in their calls of "Name you," but did not attempt to deal us any blows. They were, however, all armed with shields, spears, waddies, and boomerangs".  This was the only property "which [Gregor] wish[ed] to leave as soon as possible for several reasons".  In 1842, race relations faltered after the deaths of up to 60 Aboriginals at Kilcoy station who were poisoned by flour which was laced with strychnine. 
Gregor's diary reference may have been his reaction to information about that atrocity.
Baker's map of 1846 shows the relative positions of the pioneer families of the Somerset region around the Stanley and Brisbane Rivers.  Cressbrook is the only property still managed by the pioneering McConnel family, and both the homestead and its Victoria chapel designed by Robin Dods are now on the Queensland Heritage Register.

Two other buildings associated with this early stage of the history of the Somerset region are still available to the public. One is the Bellevue Homestead that was built for the North family and was relocated during the building of the Wivenhoe Dam. The homestead is currently privately owned by John And Laurel Dingle and is open to public. The earliest sections of Bellevue Homestead date from the 1870s and it is now heritage listed and welcomes visitors. The other is a shepherd's slab hut from Colinton Station that has been relocated to the grounds of Ringsfield House, Nanango.

Other historical sites within the Somerset region representing closer settlement, railway development and a wide diversity of business and leisure interests include the Wivenhoe and Stanley Dams, St Andrews Anglican Church & Hall, Toogoolawah and St Agnes Church and Rectory, Esk. There are heritage listed war memorials at Esk and at Linville and a dental surgery at Lowood that was originally the Royal Bank of Queensland, the Fire Tower at Jimna, the Lockyer Creek Railway bridge at Clarendon, the Rail Bridge at Harlin, the Yimbun Railway Tunnel, and existing railway stations at Coominya, Lowood, Esk, Toogoolawah and Linville.  The heritage listed Caboonbah homestead, built by H.P. Somerset, was destroyed by fire in 2009 but the public can still enjoy views of the Brisbane River from its precinct.

Local government 
The Durundur Division was incorporated on 11 November 1879 under the Divisional Boards Act 1879. Its name was changed to Esk on 5 June 1880 by proclamation. With the passage of the Local Authorities Act 1902, Esk became a shire on 31 March 1903.
The Shire of Kilcoy, historically part of the Caboolture Division and later the Shire of Caboolture, was proclaimed on 22 February 1912.
In July 2007, the Local Government Reform Commission released its report and recommended that Esk and Kilcoy amalgamate. Both councils opposed the amalgamation. On 15 March 2008, the two Shires formally ceased to exist, and elections were held on the same day to elect six councillors and a mayor to the Regional Council.

Climate 

The Somerset region experiences a humid subtropical climate (Köppen climate classification Cfa) with hot and humid summers and mild to warm winters with cool overnight temperatures.

Demography 
As at 30 June 2011, the estimated resident population of Somerset Regional was 23,137 persons, or 0.5 per cent of the Queensland's population. The Somerset Region's population in 2031 is projected to be 35,245 persons.

Recreation 
Fishing, Horse riding (trail riding, camp drafting, rodeos), cycling, water-skiing, sky diving, walking, four wheel driving, flying (small aircraft), sailing and camping are popular recreational activities.

Economy 

The primary economic activity in the Somerset region is agricultural production (120.8 million in 2006). The region is also the location of two major water storage dams – Wivenhoe and Somerset. The Wivenhoe Power Station, is a 500-megawatt, pumped storage hydroelectric plant located on the eastern side of Wivenhoe Dam.
Tourism makes a significant contribution to the local economy as Somerset region is just one hour's drive from Brisbane and the Somerset and Wivenhoe Dams offer facilities for a range of water based recreational activities.
The largest employers in the region apart from the Somerset Regional Council are the abattoir operated by the Greenmountain Trading Co and the meat processing plant operated by Australian Food Corporation Pty. Limited, which processes meat patties for McDonald's.
The Australian Bureau of Statistics ranked the Somerset region as having the third fastest-growing population by local government area in the state (2.94%, narrowly ahead of Ipswich's 2.93%) for the June 2010 – June 2011 period. The smoothed unemployment rate for the Somerset Region in the December quarter of 2011 was 4.4%.

Telecommunications 
ADSL Broadband is available in all the major population centres and there is mobile phone/3G mobile Broadband coverage in most parts of the Somerset region with some notable blackspots, especially in the north of the region and around Somerset Dam. NBN (interim) satellite Broadband is available in all locations where other forms of Broadband are not available. The Somerset region is not currently included in the NBN Co three-year roll-out plan for fibre optic cable, but it is included in the NBN Co two-year roll-out plan for fixed wireless Broadband. New greenfield developments in excess of 100 lots will be connected to NBN fibre optic as required by the Federal Government.

Wards 
The Somerset Regional Council remains undivided and its elected body consists of six councillors and a mayor, elected for a four-year term.

Mayors 
 2008–present: Graeme Lehmann

Towns and localities 

The Somerset Region includes the following settlements:

Kilcoy area:
 Kilcoy
 Glenfern
 Hazeldean
 Jimna
 Monsildale
 Villeneuve
 Winya
 Yabba
 Yendina

Esk area:
 Esk
 Borallon
 Caboonbah
 Clarendon
 Colinton
 Coolana
 Coominya
 Dundas
 Fairney View
 Fernvale
 Glamorgan Vale
 Harlin
 Lake Somerset

 Lake Wivenhoe
 Lark Hill
 Linville
 Lowood
 Minden
 Moore
 Mount Hallen
 Mount Tarampa
 Prenzlau
 Rifle Range
 Tarampa
 Toogoolawah
 Vernor
 Wanora

Other areas:
 Atkinsons Dam
 Avoca Vale
 Banks Creek1
 Biarra
 Braemore
 Brightview
 Bryden
 Buaraba
 Coal Creek
 Cooeeimbardi
 Cressbrook
 Crossdale
 England Creek1
 Eskdale
 Fulham
 Glen Esk
 Gregors Creek
 Haigslea
 Ivory Creek
 Kingaham
 Lake Manchester
 Lockrose

 Lower Cressbrook
 Marburg
 Moombra
 Mount Archer
 Mount Beppo
 Mount Byron
 Mount Kilcoy
 Mount Stanley
 Murrumba
 Ottaba
 Patrick Estate
 Redbank Creek
 Royston
 Sandy Creek
 Scrub Creek
 Sheep Station Creek
 Somerset Dam
 Split Yard Creek
 Westvale
 Wivenhoe Hill
 Wivenhoe Pocket
 Woolmar
 Yimbun

1 - split with the City of Brisbane

Also in the region are Lake Somerset and the Yabba State Forest.

Population 
The populations given relate to the component entities prior to 2008. The most recent census in 2011 was the first for the new Region.

Libraries 
The Somerset Regional Council operate public libraries at Esk, Kilcoy, Lowood, and Toogoolawah.

Notable residents 

 Lars Andersen – carpenter, builder, saw mill operator, insurance agent and undertaker
 Anita Bell – Writer of books for young adults and on Finance
 Troy Cassar-Daley – multi-award-winning country musician.
 William Robert (Fred) From- Queensland rock climber and Himalayan Mountaineer.
 Sally Harrison – Aboriginal Artist
 Cr Graeme Lehmann – Councillor in Local Government since 1994. Graeme was Deputy Mayor of the former Esk Shire Council from March 2000 until March 2004, and since March 2004 has held the position of Mayor of the former Esk Shire Council, now Somerset Regional Council.
 Hon Bill Hayden – former Member for Oxley, former Federal Government Minister and former Governor General of Australia
 Craig Lowndes – multi-championship winning Australian racing driver
 Hon Di McCauley – formerly the Member for Callide and Local Government Minister.
 Bodo Muche – sculptor
 Ian "Bunny" Pearce – Queensland Rugby League Player
 Hon Beryce Nelson – formerly the Member for Aspley, Deputy Government Whip then Minister for Family Services in the 1980s
 Henry Plantagenet Somerset (1852–1936) – landowner who attempted to warn Brisbane of the 1893 Brisbane flood
 Katarina Vesterberg – an artist and sculptor
 Sister Mary Denise Coghlan AM – humanitarian, Director of the Jesuit Refugee Services, Cambodia 
 Clive Palmer owns 3 properties in the Somerset region and deployed his helicopter to assist local residents who were stranded on rooftops during the 2011 Queensland Floods
 Kevin James Ryan – Dual international Rugby Union–Rugby League, Queensland Amateur Heavyweight Boxing Champion, ABC TV Commentator, Mayor of Hurstville, Barrister
 Everald Ernest Compton AM – Chairman of ATEC Rail Group Inland Railway, former Chairman of the National Seniors Association
 Tom Cross – Pioneer, WW1 Artist

References

 
Local government areas of Queensland
2008 establishments in Australia